John Alan Jones (born 12 September 1939) is a Welsh former professional footballer who played as a goalkeeper. He played in the English football league for Cardiff City, Exeter City, Norwich and Wrexham.

References

1939 births
Living people
Welsh footballers
Association football goalkeepers
Druids United F.C. players
Cardiff City F.C. players
Exeter City F.C. players
Norwich City F.C. players
Wrexham A.F.C. players
Sydney Olympic FC players
English Football League players
Sportspeople from Wrexham County Borough